Shahrak-e Posht Giaban (also Romanized as Shahrak-e Posht Gīābān; also known as Towḩīdābād) is a village in Poshtkuh Rural District, in the Central District of Khash County, Sistan and Baluchestan Province, Iran. At the 2006 census, its population was 831, in 149 families.

References 

Populated places in Khash County